Sophie Louise Howard (born 17 September 1993) is a footballer who plays as a defender for FA Women's Super League club Leicester City. Born in Germany, she has been a member of the Scotland national team since 2017.

Club career
On 8 June 2020, Reading announced that Howard had left the club after her contract had expired. In August 2020 Howard signed for Leicester City ahead of the 2020–21 FA Women's Championship season.

International career
Howard played twice for the Germany U20 national team in 2012. She was named in Germany's squad for the 2012 FIFA U-20 Women's World Cup in Japan, but did not get to play in any matches. In 2016 she was called into a training camp for England's new "Next Gen" team. She said: "Although I was born and brought up in Germany it's always been my ambition to play for England, and hopefully I’ve now taken my first step."

In March 2017 she was called up into the Scotland national team. The Scots had three injured defenders and were allowed to pick Howard because her grandfather is Scottish. She made her senior international debut on 11 April 2017, as a 64th-minute substitute in a 5–0 friendly defeat by Belgium in Leuven.

Career statistics
Scores and results list Scotland's goal tally first, score column indicates score after each Howard goal.

References

External links

 
 
 Sophie Howard at TSG 1899 Hoffenheim 
 

1993 births
Living people
Sportspeople from Hanau
Scottish people of English descent
Scottish people of German descent
German people of Scottish descent
German people of English descent
Footballers from Hesse
Scottish women's footballers
German women's footballers
Women's association football defenders
Scotland women's international footballers
2019 FIFA Women's World Cup players
TSG 1899 Hoffenheim (women) players
UCF Knights women's soccer players
Reading F.C. Women players
Leicester City W.F.C. players
German expatriate women's footballers
Expatriate women's soccer players in the United States
Scottish expatriate women's footballers
UEFA Women's Euro 2017 players